Sébastien Lareau and Alex O'Brien were the defending champions, but lost in semifinals to Todd Woodbridge and Mark Woodforde.

Todd Woodbridge and Mark Woodforde won the title by defeating Rick Leach and Jonathan Stark 6–3, 6–3 in the final.

Seeds
All seeds received a bye into the second round.

Draw

Finals

Top half

Bottom half

External links
 Results archive (ATP)
 Results archive (ITF)

Doubles